Wykehurst Place (or Park) is a Gothic Revival mansion in Bolney, West Sussex, England, resembling more the châteaux of the Loire than an English manor house. It was designed in 1871 by architect Edward Middleton Barry for the  banker of German extraction, Henry Huth, MP (1815–1878), a bibliophile and collector of paintings. At the time of construction (1871–74) it cost £35,000. Its turrets, arches, conical roofs, and many architectural devices give it the appearance of a fairytale mansion. The East lodge fronts the main London-Brighton road. The large black entrance gates are fashioned in wrought iron. Massive griffins with spread wings perch on either side of the gates.  The entrance to the property leads down a pebble drive to a grassed patio surrounding the house, descending from a 280-foot terrace to a garden and lawn at the back.

The mansion's exterior— "decaying at the time of writing" Nicholas Pevsner observed in 1965— and grounds have appeared in a number of films dating back to the late 1960s, including Oh! What a Lovely War, All the Colors of the Dark, Demons of the Mind, The Legend of Hell House, The Eagle Has Landed, and Holocaust 2000, among others.

The Iranian writer and filmmaker Ebrahim Golestan has owned and lived in Wykehurst Place since 1984.

Sources

Buildings and structures in West Sussex
Gothic Revival architecture in West Sussex